Lackan Ringfort is a ringfort and National Monument located in County Galway, Ireland.

Location
Lackan Ringfort is located 1.8 km (1.1 miles) northeast of Ardrahan.

History and description
Lackan Ringfort is a trivallate ringfort (rath) with souterrain.

References

National Monuments in County Galway
Archaeological sites in County Galway